More Sideways Arithmetic From Wayside School is a children's novel by Louis Sachar in the Wayside School series.  Like Sideways Arithmetic From Wayside School before it, the book resembles more like a puzzle book with a Wayside theme than a novel about Wayside.  According to the book's introduction, it was created as a response to Sideways Arithmetic after receiving complaints by students and teachers over the inclusion of the logic puzzles in the story.

Like its predecessor, More Sideways Arithmetic is organized into 15 chapters, each of which features a number of mathematical and logical puzzles, with 58 puzzles in the book.  In addition to the hints (partial solutions) and answers provided, More Sideways Arithmetic also includes "clues" (not present in Sideways Arithmetic), which aid the reader in solving the various logical puzzles.

Plot
In the first chapter, Allison invites Jason, Stephen and all the girls in class to her birthday party. She says when two or more boys are together, they start acting really silly. This is proven when Joe and John come by and indeed act silly, they don't admit it until Mrs. Jewls writes the situation as an arithmetic problem (boys + boys = silly). The girls are excited about this, until they are told that the same thing goes for girls. The next chapter simply involves Mrs. Jewls being unable to say bras because it's "crass". After that, Sue gets a new dog called Fangs, Calvin saying the dog sounds mean. When presented, Mrs. Jewls uses arithmetic (good + dog = fangs) to prove that Fangs the dog is nice. Next, some of the boys complain about them being too hot, saying "too" more times the hotter they are. Later, Miss Worm, the teacher who teaches on the story just below Mrs. Jewls's, complains about the excitementic arithmetic is causing in the class. Miss Worm is basically what Sue was like in the last arithmetic book. Later, Mrs. Jewls announces there will be a pop quiz next week. She won't tell the day, but they'll know when she tells them to take out their pencils. Todd then says that if she doesn't tell them on Thursday, they'll know the quiz will be on Friday. The other students play along with the other days, in a variation of the unexpected hanging paradox until Mrs. Jewls tells them to forget the whole thing. Then, the school flagpole was struck by lightning. So Mrs. Jewls's class makes a vote on which should be the new size. Unfortunately, the kids keep wanting more votes with the second most votes, something like a tetherball game. Ultimately, Kathy is always on the side that wins, so her size gets to be the size of the new flagpole. 

Novels by Louis Sachar
Wayside School
1994 children's books
Puzzle books
Novels set in elementary and primary schools